Do Whatever Turns You On is the second album from Scottish indie band Aberfeldy.

Track listing
 "Someone Like You"
 "Hypnotised"
 "There You Go"
 "Up Tight"
 "All True Trendies"
 "Poetry"
 "1970s"
 "Never Give Up"
 "Need to Know"
 "Whatever Turns You On"
 "Let Down"
 "Turn Me Towards the Light"

References

2006 albums
Aberfeldy (band) albums
Rough Trade Records albums